Cingalosoma anderssoni is a species of millipedes in the family Lankasomatidae. It is endemic to Sri Lanka. It is a monotypic species.

References

Chordeumatida
Animals described in 1982
Millipedes of Asia
Endemic fauna of Sri Lanka
Arthropods of Sri Lanka